Robinsonia punctata is a moth in the family Erebidae. It was described by Walter Rothschild in 1909. It is found in Mexico.

The forewings are brown with a large diamond-shaped silvery-white patch in the submedian interspace. There is a second large oval patch extending from just inside the apex of the cell to the apex. The hindwings are silvery white.

References

Moths described in 1909
Robinsonia (moth)